The 1953 Iowa State Cyclones football team represented Iowa State College of Agricultural and Mechanic Arts (later renamed Iowa State University) in the Big Seven Conference during the 1953 college football season. In their seventh and final year under head coach Abe Stuber, the Cyclones compiled a 2–7 record (1–5 against conference opponents), finished in last place in the conference, and were outscored by their opponents by a combined total of 211 to 120. They played their home games at Clyde Williams Field in Ames, Iowa.

The team's regular starting lineup on offense consisted of left end Barney Alleman, left tackle Ralph Brown, left guard Bill Wilson, center Jim Rawley, right guard Gean Kowalski, right tackle Jack Lessin, right end Kim Tidd, quarterback Bill Plantan, left halfback Dan Rice, right halfback Dick Cox, and fullback Max Burkett. Jack Lessin and Jim Rawley were the team captains.

The team's statistical leaders included Max Burkett with 342 rushing yards, Bill Plantan with 723 passing yards and 41 points (five touchdowns and 11 extra points), and Gary Lutz with 249 receiving yards. Max Burkett was selected as a first-team all-conference player.

Schedule

References

Iowa State
Iowa State Cyclones football seasons
Iowa State Cyclones football